The 1940 Brighton by-election was held on 9 May 1940.  The by-election was held due to the elevation to the peerage of the incumbent Conservative MP, George Tryon.  It was won by the Conservative candidate Lord Erskine, who was unopposed.

References

1940 elections in the United Kingdom
1940 in England
20th century in Sussex
Politics of Brighton and Hove
By-elections to the Parliament of the United Kingdom in East Sussex constituencies
Unopposed by-elections to the Parliament of the United Kingdom (need citation)
May 1940 events